The  from 463 was a revolt against the Yamato state on the Korean peninsula, involving two brothers from the Kibi clan: Tasa and Oto. The revolt was triggered when Tasa learned that the Japanese Emperor Yūryaku had moved him to the Japanese post at Mimana on the Korean Peninsula in order to seize his beautiful wife. The incident falls into Japan's proto-historic period and is recounted in the Nihon Shoki.

Outline
When Yūryaku ascended the throne in 456, Japan was on friendly terms with the Korean kingdom of Paekche and—since the reign of Empress Jingū (201–269)—also held a military outpost on the Korean peninsula at Mimana.  However relations with the neighboring kingdom of Silla had been strained after the harsh treatment of their convoy in 453. Angered by this incident, Silla had reduced the number of ships between the countries and articles sent as tribute. Since 456, Silla had not sent the customary presents to the Japanese Emperor.

In 463, Tasa, omi of Upper Kibi, was at the Imperial Palace and speaking to his friends, praised his wife, Waka:

In order to possess Waka, Emperor Yūryaku had Tasa moved out of the way to the distant post of governor of Mimana and made Waka-hime one of his concubines. When Tasa learned that he had been robbed of his wife, he started a revolt looking for help from Silla. Yūryaku, known for his cruelty, ordered Tasa's son, Oto, to lead an army against his father. Oto was joined by a group of men who wanted to secure skilled artisans from Paekche.  Oto had settled for several months in Paekche (without taking any action against Tasa or Silla) when he received a message from his father suggesting he hold Mimana and Paekche and break off communication with Japan:

However Oto's wife, Kusu, was a very patriotic woman who foiled Tasa's plot by killing her husband. Over several years, Yūryaku sent four expeditions to Korea, but could not recover his hold on the peninsula.  Brinkley asserts that Japan lost its standing in Korea "because of Yūryaku's illicit passion for one of his subjects."  After the death of Yūryaku on the 7th day of the 8th month, 479, Prince Hoshikawa, encouraged by his mother, the "robbed" consort Waka-hime, claimed the throne against the designated crown prince, Shiraka, which led to the Prince Hoshikawa Rebellion.

See also
List of Japanese battles
Military history of Japan

Notes

References

Bibliography

Battles involving Japan
460s conflicts
Kofun period
463
5th century in Japan
5th-century rebellions
Rebellions in Japan